"Sochta Hoon" is a ghazal-qawwali written and performed by Nusrat Fateh Ali Khan, originally in UK
1985 Tour on 28 February at Allah Ditta Centre Birmingham. It had been popularized by him and his nephew Rahat Fateh Ali Khan several times in different concerts.

2016 remix 

It was recreated and released as a single on 5 July 2016 by A1melodymaster for the album Reformed; which released on 16 March 2017 with different renewed songs of Nusrat Fateh Ali Khan.

2018 film version 

It was recreated by lyricist Manoj Muntashir and composer Rochak Kohli for Shree Narayan Singh's 2018 Hindi film Batti Gul Meter Chalu. Under the title "Dekhte Dekhte" (Hindi: "देखते देखते"), it was released in two versions, first by Atif Aslam and second by Rahat Fateh Ali Khan. The song has been picturised on the star cast Shahid Kapoor and Shraddha Kapoor. It was produced by Bhushan Kumar under his label T-Series, whose sister Tulsi Kumar also covered the song.

After the release of Aslam's version, it became the most viewed Hindi song on YouTube with more than 20 million views within 24 hours, and rose up to trending #2 on YouTube India. It also topped the iTunes India Chart and BBC Asian Music Chart with #1 position.

Popularity 
Due to its popularity, the song has been covered by some artists in Pakistan and India; including Junaid Asghar, Sonu Kakkar and Manan Bhardwaj. Other cover versions were released by Qazi Touqeer, Shreya Karmakar, Satyajeet Jena and Arshman Naeem.

The titular lyrics from the 2018 film version went viral as a social media meme.

See also 
Nusrat Fateh Ali Khan discography
Rahat Fateh Ali Khan discography
Atif Aslam discography

References

External links 

 

1985 songs
Nusrat Fateh Ali Khan songs
Ghazal songs
Rahat Fateh Ali Khan songs
Atif Aslam songs
Songs with lyrics by Manoj Muntashir
Hindi film songs
T-Series (company) singles